Hot Country Songs is a chart that ranks the top-performing country music songs in the United States, published by Billboard magazine. In 2009, 30 different songs topped the chart in 52 issues of the magazine, based on weekly airplay data from country music radio stations compiled by Nielsen Broadcast Data Systems.

Four acts achieved their first number-one hit in 2009.  The first was Mac McAnally, whose appearance as a guest vocalist on Kenny Chesney's cover version of his 1990 song "Down the Road" gave him his first appearance at the top of the chart in a career which stretched back to the 1970s.  The group Lady Antebellum spent one week at number one in July with its first chart-topper, "I Run to You", and returned to the top with "Need You Now", which spent the last five weeks of the year at number one, the longest spell at the top by a single song.  The six weeks which the trio spent at number one was the most by any act in 2009.  "Need You Now" also achieved considerable crossover success, topping the Adult Contemporary and Adult Top 40 charts and reaching number 2 in Billboards all-genre singles chart, the Hot 100.  In October, both Justin Moore and Chris Young reached the top spot for the first time, with "Small Town USA" and "Gettin' You Home (The Black Dress Song)" respectively.  This would be the first of five consecutive number-one hits for Young over a two-year period.

In addition to Lady Antebellum, Jason Aldean, Dierks Bentley, Kenny Chesney, Toby Keith, Brad Paisley, Rascal Flatts, Darius Rucker and Sugarland all achieved two number ones in 2009.  Aldean's "Big Green Tractor" spent four weeks at number one in the fall, the first song to spend four weeks in the top spot since February of the previous year.   Keith Urban was the only act to reach number one with three different songs, "Sweet Thing", "Only You Can Love Me This Way", and "Start a Band", a duet with Brad Paisley.

Chart history

See also
2009 in music
List of artists who reached number one on the U.S. country chart

References

2009
United States Country Singles
Number-one country singles